Buzza Tower is a Grade II listed structure on St Mary's, Isles of Scilly now used as a camera obscura.

The tower was built in 1821 as a windmill. It was restored in 1912 as a memorial to King Edward VII when the exterior was provided with sheltered seating.
 
Between 2012 and 2014 the tower was restored and a camera obscura was installed which opened to the public in 2014.

References

Buildings and structures in the Isles of Scilly
Grade II listed buildings in Cornwall
Camera obscuras
Windmills completed in 1821
St Mary's, Isles of Scilly